Marius Popp (21 September 1935, in Sibiu – 8 November 2016) was a Romanian jazz pianist and composer.

Popp, who graduated from the Institute of Architecture Ion Mincu in Bucharest, studied with Maricica Neagu (piano), Ana Severa Benţia (piano), Alexandru Paşcanu (musical theory, solfège, harmony), and Corneliu Gheorghiu (piano).

Musical activity 
He has participated in many jazz festivals: Ploiești, Sibiu, San Sebastián, Ljubliana, Prague, Warsaw, Debrecen, Nagykanizsa, Mannheim, Göttingen, Tel Aviv, Russe, Frankfurt am Main, Vienna, Munich, Gărâna, etc. He played with Lionel Hampton when the latter had a concert in București (1971). He was a member of the Mihai Berindei Sextet, of the București Jazz Quartet, and has played with Aura Urziceanu, Pedro Negrescu, Eugen Gondi, Johnny Răducanu, etc. He was a regular of Electrecord's Jazz Series.

He has also collaborated with the Austrian saxophonist Harry Sokal.

Since 1999 he has been a lecturer at the Appenzeller Jazz Days, Switzerland.

Discography (selection)

Vinyl LPs 
 Jazz in trio, Electrecord, 1967
 Panoramic jazz-rock (1977, Electrecord EDE 01266)
 Nodul gordian – Seria jazz nr. 20 (1983, Electrecord EDE 02377)
 Acordul fin. Fine Tuning – Seria jazz nr. 24 (1989, Electrecord EDE 03503)
 Flașnetarium (1995, EDE 04401)
 Margine de lume, 2013

CDs 
 Essential (2006, Electrecord EDC 671) – guest musicians: Peter Wertheimer, Eugen Gondi, Dan Andrei Aldea, Decebal Bădilă, Alin Constanțiu and others.
 Semințe prăjite. Roasted Seeds (2008, Electrecord EDC 889)

Film scores
Mijlocaș la dechidere (1979, directorț Dinu Tănase)
Întoarce-te și mai privește o dată (1981, director: Dinu Tănase)
Destinația Mahmudia (1981, director: Alexandru Boiangiu)
La capătul liniei (1982, director: Dinu Tănase)
Galax (director: Ion Popescu-Gopo)
Rețeaua S. (director: Virgil Calotescu)

Stage music
Richard III
Afară în fața ușii
Astă seară Lola Blau

Books
Armonia aplicativă în improvizația de jazz, București, Edit. Nemira, 1998 
34 teme de jazz, București, Edit. Muzicală, 2004

Awards 
 Romanian Composers' and Musicologists' Union Award
 UNITER Award
 Romanian Musical Critics' Union Award
 Actualitatea muzicală Magazine's Award

References 
Daniela Caraman Fotea, Florian Lungu, Disco ghid-rock, Ed. Muzicala, Bucuresti, 1977, pp. 172–173
 Mihai Berindei, Dicționar de jazz, Ed. Științifică și Enciclopedică, București, 1976

External links 
 Marius Popp at Discogs 
Detailed biography on the Romanian Composers' and Musicologists' Union web site 

1935 births
2016 deaths
Romanian jazz pianists
Romanian composers
Musicians from Sibiu